Theunis Uilke (Theun) de Vries (26 April 1907 – 21 January 2005), was a Dutch writer and poet.

Life 

De Vries was born in the Frisian town of Feanwâlden. His parents moved to Apeldoorn in 1920. In 1936 he joined the Communist Party of the Netherlands and a year later he moved to Amsterdam to pursue a career in journalism. He became editor of the communist newspaper De Tribune and De Vrije Katheder. During the occupation of the Netherlands by the Nazi forces he was arrested and imprisoned in Kamp Amersfoort. After the war he eventually became a member of the city council of Amsterdam. In 1971 he left the party without renouncing marxism, which he continued to uphold until the end of his life.

He died in Amsterdam at the age of 97 after having suffered from several bouts of pneumonia.

Works 

De Vries wrote poetry and many novels, both in Dutch and Frisian. Among his most acclaimed novels are Het meisje met het rode haar (The Girl with the Red Hair) and the trilogy Februari (February), both novels about the Dutch resistance in World War II; the former also being very successful as a movie (Ben Verbong, 1981).

From his several biographies, his book on Spinoza received international fame, and was translated. Other biographical subjects included i.a. Karl Marx, R.J. Schimmelpenninck, Haydn, Bosch, Rembrandt, Van Gogh.

He also wrote a comprehensive and academic history of the Christian heretical movements, Ketters (Heretics).

1907 births
2005 deaths
20th-century Dutch novelists
20th-century Dutch male writers
Frisian writers
Dutch male novelists
Dutch resistance members
People from Dantumadiel
P. C. Hooft Award winners